A royalty fund (also known as royalty funding) is a category of private equity fund that specializes in purchasing consistent revenue streams deriving from the payment of royalties. One growing subset of this category is the healthcare royalty fund, in which a private equity fund manager purchases a royalty stream paid by a pharmaceutical company to a patent holder. The patent holder can be another company, an individual inventor, or some sort of institution, such as a research university.

Royalties are a usage-based payment from one individual or entity to another individual or entity, giving the right to the use of an asset, product, service or idea.

Structure of Royalty Investments 

Royalty funds are a specific type of income trust, used for special-purpose finance, created to hold investments or cash flow in operating companies. These funds aren’t stocks or bonds but a form of investment fund. A royalty fund raises capital in order to purchase the right to a royalty of a product or service. However, unlike many other corporate entities, the profits derived from the royalties aren’t taxed on a corporate level. These profits are distributed to shareholders in the form of a dividend, which is taxed on the personal income level. By doing so it avoids double taxation, enabling higher returns on dividends. Thus making royalty funds an attractive investment.

Royalty funds are structured in a number of ways. A fund can purchase a royalty or a percentage of a royalty from researchers at a university or a corporate entity for examples a Biotech firm, therefore exchanging capital for ownership of the royalty. Alternatively, the fund can act as a private equity vehicle, extending debt or making loans, in exchange for a proportion of the royalty or securing other assets from the institution as collateral. Usually, investments make go to fund a research project or cover costs of a research project. Royalty funds invest in a range of business areas, including, commodities, energy, entertainment, franchise, patents and IP, pharmaceuticals, and other trademark royalties.

An example would be a company making an investment into a pharmaceutical company through the acquisition of a healthcare product or service royalty. The operation of the pharmaceutical company continues, as usual, manufacturing and distribution of the products or services. But once the product has been sold a proportion of the profits will go to the fund that purchased the royalty (the amount or percentage will vary between companies based on the acquisition/investment terms).

Another example would be the purchase of royalties in the oil and gas industry, where the rights oil wells, oil mines or oil fields are owned by a royalty fund or also known as royalty trust. Other companies perform the operational aspect of extracting the minerals, paying a “royalty” in order to extract them.

Funds vs. Investment Trust 
Investing in composite funds gives an investor the opportunity to gain exposure into foreign markets that they wouldn't be able to do on their own. By investing in a fund and not one particular stock, an investor is able to reduce their level of risk, by spreading their investment over an average number of 50 assets. This increases an investors diversity and reduces the level of risk. This is possible due to the pooling of capital from multiple investors. Fund managers represent the investors and meet with executives and conduct deals.

There are two main decisions an investor can make; 
 Where to invest (emerging markets or global financial companies, commodities, etc.) 
 How to invest (Open-end fund or Closed-end funds)

Open-end Funds 
By making an investment into an open-end fund, you are essentially buying ownership stake into a range of investments managed by the fund manager. The fund manager combines all the investors capital and aims is to increase its value. The share prices will be dependent on the value of the assets held by the fund, divided by the number of outstanding shares. Shares outstanding are all the shares authorized, issued and purchased by investors.

However, this sort of fund can cause liquidity issues, if a lot of shareholders decide to withdraw their funds, resulting in a negative effect on the performance of the fund. This also makes open-end funds less suitable for certain assets. For example, in 2007-2008 during the financial crisis, investors lost a lot of capital, because the fund managers weren't able to sell off assets quick enough. The investors capital was stuck in the funds for months.

Closed-end Funds 
Like an open-end fund, closed-end funds pool capital from a variety of investors and has a fund manager make investments on their part. Closed-end funds also have a board of directors to provide another level of oversight of the investments made.

Fees and charges tend to be lower than open-end funds, which means that; 
 Fixed pool of assets
 Funds performance unaffected by asset flows

However, since assets are being bought and sold between investors in the fund prices can be undervalued or overvalued. Meaning that investors could be at an advantage or disadvantage when buying or selling shares. A final overall drawback is that investment funds aren't offered by many platforms, meaning investors would have a hard time finding them.

Benefits & Disadvantages

Benefits 
This includes: 
 High Yield, royalty funds offer attractive yields to investors in comparison to stocks and bonds. High-end royalty funds offer 8-15% in dividends. 
 Powerful Investment Tool for people who don’t have the resources or risk tolerance to buy into a certain industry, but wish to invest directly into an industry on a smaller scale. 
 Tax-Advantage Yield, higher yields as profits don’t need to be taxed on a corporate level. 
 No Corporate Taxes, profits are passed onto the holders of the fund and are declared on their individual tax returns. Enables double taxation to be avoided. 
 Peculiar Tax Credits. For example, tax breaks may be offered if the investment is in a pharmaceutical product that would benefit health care. It is in the government’s interest to offer such a tax break to boost R&D of new products that would help the society. 
 Potential Inflation Hedge. Since investments are made into assets, the inflation of cash would be avoided. However, the asset would need to be non-depreciative, otherwise the investment may not be profitable. 
 Higher Sales Price, it appeals to companies who want to sell assets producing cash flow, because they have a higher sales price than what is achievable with conventional finance tools.

Disadvantages 
This includes:
 Sensitive to interest rates. Share prices will decline when interest rates go up and increase when interest rates fall. 
 Too good to be true. Often referred to as a “get rich quick,” which could indicate that it’s an industry with quite some risk if you are one wrong side. Additionally, there is no such thing as “getting rich quick,” good things take time. 
 Volatile Markets, oil and gas, pharmaceuticals, etc. Performance based, an element of high risk = high reward. If a project fails, the outcome would be no revenue and no profit, resulting in a loss. However, if it does succeed the rewards are high.  
 High level of risk that a royalty/patent won’t pay off. Because investments are made into researching institutions ahead of time, it can never be certain whether a patent for a pharmaceutical product or potential oil field will actually pay off. 
 Investments are complex due to the nature of how investments are made. In order for the fund to be successful, it requires a lot of research and in-depth knowledge of the industry. So investment in specific management of analysts, scientists, geologists, etc. is necessary in order for research to be accurate and profitable. The way of investing is also specific, a lot of paperwork and contracts need to be cleared in order for the purchase to go from the researcher to the fund.

Examples in Intangible Asset Finance 
Intangible asset finance deals with the financing of intangible assets such as patents, trademarks, intellectual property, reputations, etc. In 2003, the intangible assets economy of the U.S. was estimated at $5 trillion.

Royalty Pharma: (investing in top therapeutics, typically billion dollar blockbusters products.)
PDL BioPharma: (investing mainly in antibody humanization patents and license agreements in different biotechnology and pharmaceutical companies.)
Permian Basin Royalty Trust: (leading royalty trust in oil and natural gas, with a market cap of US $790,000,000).

History and Significant transactions 
 David Bowie issues Bowie Bonds on future royalty revenues derived from 25 albums recorded before 1990. 
 In 2000 PDL BioPharma completed a $115 million deal for a single patent from Yale University. The patent claims to cover Stavudine, a nucleoside analog reverse-transcriptase (NARTI) active against HIV. This was the first acquisition ever made of one whole single pharmaceutical patent. 
 In 2005 UCC Capital Corporation securitization of BDBG generating property right revenues of roughly $53 million. First to be recognized as a “whole company securitization” containing primarily intangible assets. 
 2005 also included the first ever-live Intellectual Property (IP) auction. Launched by Ocean Tomo, the aim was to speed up patent deals by bringing together patent buyers and sellers in a single venue. Its tremendous success monetarily has resulted in further developments, including an online platform, Royalty Exchange where property rights/patents can be sold and bought.
 In 2014 Royalty Pharma acquired the royalty stream promised to the Cystic Fibrosis Foundation by Vertex Pharmaceuticals on sales of the drug, Kalydeco,  for $3.3 billion; the CFF had invested in discovery and development of the drug under the venture philanthropy model, and said it intended to use proceeds from the royalty sale to further invest in treatments for cystic fibrosis.Lauren Arcuri Ware for the Robb Report.  April 1, 2014 Venture Philanthropy: A New Driver for Research

References

Private equity
Investment
Equity securities
Corporate finance
Financial markets